The East Liverpool Potters were a minor league baseball club, located in East Liverpool, Ohio, from 1906 until 1912. The team first played its first two seasons in the Pennsylvania–Ohio–Maryland League, before moving to the Ohio–Pennsylvania League in 1908. The team first disbanded on August 20, 1911, however a new Potters team took the field the following season.

However the 1912 season proved to be the last for the Potters. The team moved to Pittsburgh, Pennsylvania on August 14, 1912 to become Pittsburgh in the team listings. The team's time in Pittsburgh was also brief. Just four days later, on August 18, 1912, the team relocated to New Martinsville, West Virginia, to become New Martinsville in the team listings. The club then folded at the end of the season.

Year-by-year record

Baseball teams established in 1906
Baseball teams disestablished in 1912
Defunct minor league baseball teams
1906 establishments in Ohio
1912 disestablishments in West Virginia
Defunct baseball teams in Ohio
East Liverpool, Ohio
Wetzel County, West Virginia
Baseball teams in Pittsburgh
Ohio-Pennsylvania League teams